Vyšné Ladičkovce is a village and municipality in Humenné District in the Prešov Region of north-east Slovakia.

History
In historical records the village was first mentioned in 1427.

Geography
The municipality lies at an altitude of 230 metres and covers an area of 15.403 km².
It has a population of about 230 people.

External links
 
 https://web.archive.org/web/20070427022352/http://www.statistics.sk/mosmis/eng/run.html 

Villages and municipalities in Humenné District
Zemplín (region)